Ken Curtis (born Curtis Wain Gates; July 2, 1916 – April 28, 1991) was an American singer and actor best known for his role as Festus Haggen on the CBS western television series Gunsmoke. Although he appeared on Gunsmoke earlier in other roles (such as “Brisco” in S4E32’s “Change Of Heart), he was first cast as Festus in season 8 episode 13, December 8, 1962 "Us Haggens." His next appearance was Season 9, episode 2, October 5, 1963 as Kyle Kelly, in "Lover Boy." Curtis joined the cast of Gunsmoke permanently as Festus in "Prairie Wolfer," season 9 episode 16, January 18, 1964; though this fact is often confused with a 1969 episode of the same name ("Prairie Wolfer") made five years later (S13E10).

Early years
Born the youngest  of three boys in Lamar in Prowers County in southeastern Colorado, Curtis lived his first ten years on a ranch on Muddy Creek in eastern Bent County. In 1926, the family moved to Las Animas, the county seat of Bent County, so that his father, Dan Sullivan Gates, could run for sheriff.  The campaign was successful, and Gates served from 1926 to 1931 as Bent County sheriff. The family lived below the jail, since the jail was the whole second floor and his mother, Nellie Sneed Gates, cooked for the prisoners. The jail is located for historical preservation purposes on the grounds of the Bent County Courthouse in Las Animas.

Curtis was the quarterback of his Bent County High School football team and played clarinet in the school band. He graduated in 1935. During World War II, Curtis served in the United States Army from 1943 to 1945.

He attended Colorado College to study medicine, but left after a short time to pursue his musical career.

Career

Music

Curtis was a singer before moving into acting, and combined both careers once he entered films. Curtis was with the Tommy Dorsey band in 1941, and succeeded Frank Sinatra as vocalist until Dick Haymes contractually replaced Sinatra in 1942. Curtis may have served simply as insurance against Sinatra's likely defection, and it was Dorsey who suggested that Gates change his name to Ken Curtis.  Curtis then joined Shep Fields and His New Music, an all-reeds band that dispensed with a brass section.

Curtis met his first wife, Lorraine Page, at Universal Studios, and they were married in 1943. For much of 1948, Curtis was a featured singer and host of the long-running country music radio program WWVA Jamboree.

Ken Curtis joined the Sons of the Pioneers as a lead singer from 1949 to 1952. His big hits with the group included "Room Full of Roses" and "(Ghost) Riders in the Sky".

Film
Columbia Pictures signed Curtis to a contract in 1945. He starred in a series of musical Westerns with the Hoosier Hot Shots, playing singing cowboy romantic leads.
   
By virtue of his second marriage, Curtis was a son-in-law of film director John Ford. Curtis teamed with Ford and John Wayne in Rio Grande.  He was a singer in the movie's fictional band The Regimental Singers that actually consisted of the Sons of the Pioneers; Curtis is not listed as a member of the principal cast. It is possible that he played a bit part, but Curtis is best remembered as Charlie McCorry in The Searchers, The Quiet Man, The Wings of Eagles, The Horse Soldiers, The Alamo, and How The West Was Won. Curtis also joined Ford, along with Henry Fonda, James Cagney, William Powell, and Jack Lemmon, in the comedy Navy classic Mister Roberts. He was featured in all three of the only films produced by Cornelius Vanderbilt Whitney's C. V. Whitney Pictures: The Searchers (1956); The Missouri Traveler (1958) with Brandon deWilde and Lee Marvin; and The Young Land (1959) with Patrick Wayne and Dennis Hopper. In 5 Steps to Danger (1957 film), he is uncredited as FBI Agent Jim Anderson. Curtis also produced two extremely low-budget monster films in 1959, The Killer Shrews and The Giant Gila Monster.  Also, in the film adaptation Conagher based on a book by popular writer Louis L'Amour, he starred opposite Sam Elliott as an aging cattleman.

Curtis guest-starred five times on the Western television series Have Gun – Will Travel with Richard Boone. In 1959, he appeared as cowhand Phil Jakes on the Gunsmoke season four episode, "Jayhawkers". He also guest-starred as circus performer Tim Durant on an episode of Perry Mason, "The Case of the Clumsy Clown", which originally aired on November 5, 1960. Later, he appeared in Ripcord, a first-run syndicated action/adventure series about a company of its namesake providing skydiving services, along with its leading star Larry Pennell. This series ran from 1961 to 1963 with 76 half-hour episodes in total. Curtis played the role of James (Jim) Buckley and Pennell was his young disciple Theodore (Ted) McKeever. This television show helped generate interest in sport parachuting.

In 1964, Curtis appeared as muleskinner Graydon in the episode "Graydon's Charge" of the syndicated Western television series, Death Valley Days, also guest-starring Denver Pyle and Cathy Lewis.

Gunsmoke

Curtis remains best known for his role as Festus Haggen, the scruffy, cantankerous, and illiterate deputy in Gunsmoke. He joined the Gunsmoke cast in 1967, superseding the previous deputy, Thaddeus "Thad" Greenwood, played by Roger Ewing. While Marshal Matt Dillon had a total of five deputies over two decades, Festus held the role the longest (11 years), in 304 episodes. Festus was patterned after "Cedar Jack" (Frederick Munden), a man from Curtis' Las Animas childhood. Cedar Jack, who lived 15 miles south of town, made a living cutting cedar fence posts. Curtis observed many times that Jack came to Las Animas, where he would often end up drunk and in Curtis' father's jail.  Festus' character was known, in part, for the nasally, twangy, rural accent which Curtis developed for the role, but which did not reflect Curtis' actual voice.

Besides engaging in the usual personal appearances most television stars undertake to promote their program, Curtis also traveled around the country performing at Western-themed stage shows at fairs, rodeos, and other venues when Gunsmoke was not in production, and even for some years after the show was cancelled. Curtis also campaigned for Ronald Reagan in 1976, during the future President's attempt to secure the Republican nomination from incumbent Gerald Ford.

In two episodes of Gunsmoke, Carroll O'Connor was a guest-star; years later, Curtis guest-starred as a retired police detective on O'Connor's NBC program In the Heat of the Night. He voiced Nutsy the vulture in Disney's 1973 animated film Robin Hood. A decade later, he returned to television in the short-lived Western series The Yellow Rose, in which he performed most of his scenes with Noah Beery, Jr.

Last years
In 1981, Curtis was inducted into the Western Performers Hall of Fame at the National Cowboy & Western Heritage Museum in Oklahoma City, Oklahoma.

Curtis' last acting role was as the aging cattle rancher "Seaborn Tay" in the television production Conagher (1991), by western author Louis L'Amour. Sam Elliott starred in the lead role, and Curtis' Gunsmoke co-star Buck Taylor (Newly O'Brien) played a bad man in the same film. Buck Taylor's father, Dub Taylor, had a minor role in it.

Curtis married Torrie Connelly in 1966. They were married until his death in 1991 and he had two step-children.

A statue of Ken Curtis as Festus can be found at 430 Pollasky Avenue in Clovis, California, in Fresno County in front of the Educational Employees Credit Union. In his later years, Curtis resided in Clovis.

Curtis was a Republican and supported Barry Goldwater in the 1964 United States presidential election.

Death 
Curtis died on April 28, 1991 in his sleep of a heart attack in Fresno, California. He was cremated, and his ashes were scattered in the Colorado flatlands.

Selected filmography 

 Santa Fe Trail (1940) — Officer singing at celebration (uncredited)
 Rhythm Round-Up (1945) — Jimmy Benson
 Song of the Prairie (1945) — Dan Tyler
 Out of the Depths (1945) — Buck Clayton
 Throw a Saddle on a Star (1946) — Curt Walker
 That Texas Jamboree (1946) — Curt Chambers
 Cowboy Blues (1946) — Curt Durant
 Singing on the Trail (1946) — Curt Stanton
 Lone Star Moonlight (1946) — Curt Norton
 Over the Santa Fe Trail (1947) — Curt Mason
 Riders of the Pony Express (1949) — Tom Blake
 Stallion Canyon (1949) — Curt Benson
 Call of the Forest (1949) — Bob Brand
 Everybody's Dancin (1950) — Ken — Member Sons of the Pioneers
 Rio Grande (1950) — Donnelly — Regimental Singer (uncredited) 
 Don Daredevil Rides Again (1951) — Lee Hadley aka Don Daredevil
 Fighting Coast Guard (1951) — Ken — Member Sons of the Pioneers
 The Quiet Man (1952) — Dermot Fahy (uncredited)
 The Long Gray Line (1955) — Specialty (uncredited)
 Mr. Roberts (1955) — Yeoman 3rd Class Dolan
 The Searchers (1956) — Charlie McCorry
 5 Steps to Danger (1956) — FBI Agent Jim Anderson (uncredited)
 The Wings of Eagles (1957) — John Dale Price
 Spring Reunion (1957) — Al
 The Missouri Traveler (1958) — Fred Mueller
 The Last Hurrah (1958) — Monsignor Killian
 Escort West (1958) — Trooper Burch
 The Young Land (1959) — Lee Hearn
 The Horse Soldiers (1959) — Cpl. Wilkie
 The Killer Shrews (1959) — Jerry Farrell
 My Dog, Buddy (1960) — Dr. Lusk
 Freckles (1960) — Wessner
 The Alamo (1960) — Capt. Almeron Dickinson
 Two Rode Together (1961) — Greeley Clegg
 How the West Was Won (1962) — Cpl. Ben (uncredited)
 Cheyenne Autumn (1964) — Joe
 Robin Hood (1973) — Nutsy, the Vulture (voice)
 Pony Express Rider (1976) — Jed Richardson
 Legend of the Wild (1981)
 Lost (1983)
 Once Upon a Texas Train (1988) — Kelly Sutton (John Henry's Gang)
 Conagher (1991, TV Movie) — Seaborn Tay, Cattle Rancher (final film role)

Television

 The Life and Legend of Wyatt Earp (1957) — episode — Warpath —  Major Hendericks (uncredited)
 Gunsmoke (1959) — episode — Change of Heart — 
 Gunsmoke (1960) — episode — Speak Me Fair — Daryl
 Gunsmoke (1959) — episode — Jayhawkers – Jacks
 Have Gun – Will Travel (1959–1960) — Monk
 Gunsmoke (1960) — episode — The Ex-Urbanites — Jesse
 Wagon Train (1960) — episode — The Horace Best Story — Pappy Lightfoot
 Wagon Train (1960) — episode — The Colter Craven Story — Kyle Cleatus
 Perry Mason (1960) — S4 E7 (102) The Case of the Clumsy Clown- Tim Durant
 Sea Hunt (1961) — episode — The Octopus Story — Professor Dean Austin – Season 4, Episode 20
 Ripcord  (1961–1963) — Skydiver James (Jim) Buckley
 The Aquanauts (1961) — two episodes — Horton/head waiter 
 Gunsmoke (1962–1975) — Festus (304 episodes)
 Gunsmoke  (1963) episode — Lover Boy — Kyle Kelly
 Death Valley Days (1964) — Graydon's Charge — Graydon
 The Life and Times of Grizzly Adams (1978) — episode — Once Upon a Starry Night — Uncle Ned
 Vega$ (1979) — Digger Dennison
 How the West Was Won (1979) — Sheriff Orville Gant
 The Yellow Rose (1983–1984) — Hoyt Coryell
 Airwolf (1986) — Cecil Carnes Sr.
 In the Heat of the Night (1990) — Tom McCaul
 Conagher (1991) — Seaborn Tay

References

External links

 
 Michael Breid shares memories of being part of Ken Curtis' backup band for his stage show during the 1970s
 
 

1916 births
1991 deaths
20th-century American male actors
20th-century American singers
20th-century American male singers
American country singers
American male film actors
California Republicans
Colorado College alumni
Country musicians from California
High school football players in the United States
Liberty Records artists
Male Western (genre) film actors
Male actors from Colorado
Male actors from Fresno, California
Military personnel from Colorado
Musicians from Fresno, California
People from Lamar, Colorado
People from Las Animas, Colorado
Country musicians from Colorado
Singers from Colorado
Singing cowboys
Sons of the Pioneers members
United States Army personnel of World War II
Western (genre) television actors
Columbia Pictures contract players